Cheyenne Rides Again is a 1937 Western film directed by Robert F. Hill. It stars Tom Tyler and Lon Chaney Jr. Much as did Alfred Hitchcock in his own films, director Hill appears in a cameo as townsman "Bartender Ed".

Plot
Tom 'Cheyenne Tommy' Wade (Tom Tyler), is a lawman who poses as a gang member in an attempt to expose Girard (Lon Chaney Jr.), a fraudulent cattle thief. He steals one thousand dollars from the thief, promising to return it if he can join the gang, while plotting a way to expose them as thieves. As Cheyenne is let into the gang, he begins to blackmail the leader, forcing him to let more law enforcers join the gang, eventually outnumbering them and finally arresting the thieves for good.

Cast
  Tom Tyler as Tom 'Cheyenne Tommy' Wade
  Lon Chaney Jr. as Girard
 Carmen Laroux as Panela 
 Lucile Browne as Sally Lane
 Ed Cassidy as Dave Gleason
 Ted Lorch as Rollin
 Merrill McCormick as Gang Member
 Slim Whitaker as Sheriff Jed Martin
 Robert F. Hill as Bartender Ed
 Merrill McCormick as Henchman
 Jack Smith as Jack
 Roger Williams as  Henchman Mack

Reception
Reception for Cheyenne Rides Again was generally positive. Film historian Hal J. Wollstein wrote that: "The Katzman stamp of poverty is all over this Victory Pictures production, but it is fun to watch Tyler and Chaney, both of whom would later star as the mummy, Kharis, for Universal in the '40s."  TV Guide offered that while the film was not very good, Tom Tyler's character kept the film moving.

Release
The film aired on television on January 9, 1965 as one of the many western films shared on The Wild Bill Elliott Show.   Alpha Video released Cheyenne Rides Again on DVD on April 27, 2010.

References

External links

1937 films
1930s English-language films
American black-and-white films
1937 Western (genre) films
Films directed by Robert F. Hill
American Western (genre) films
Films produced by Sam Katzman
1930s American films